Cytochrome c oxidase assembly factor COX20 is a protein that in humans is encoded by the COX20 gene. This gene encodes a protein that plays a role in the assembly of cytochrome c oxidase, an important component of the respiratory pathway. Mutations in this gene can cause mitochondrial complex IV deficiency. There are multiple pseudogenes for this gene. Alternative splicing results in multiple transcript variants.

Structure
The COX20 gene is located on the q arm of chromosome 1 at position 44 and it spans 9,757 base pairs. The COX20 gene produces a 13.3 kDa protein composed of 118 amino acids. It contains two transmembrane helices and localizes to the mitochondrial membrane.

Function
The COX20 gene encodes for a protein required for the assembly of cytochrome c oxidase (complex IV). Complex IV is the terminal complex of the mitochondrial respiratory chain which is required for catalyzing the oxidation of cytochrome c by molecular oxygen. COX20 is known to act as a chaperone protein during the early stages of COX2 (cytochrome c oxidase subunit II) maturation which leads to the stabilization of the protein. By presenting COX2 to the metallochaperones SCO1 and SCO2, they help facilitate the incorporation of the mature COX2 into the complex IV holoenzyme assembly. However, it has been known that COX20 has no influence on transcription or translation of COX2 or any other genes. The knockdown of the protein COX20 has been shown to result in reduced respiratory capacity and the accumulation of respiratory chain intermediates.

Clinical significance
Variants of COX20 have been associated with the mitochondrial Complex IV deficiency, a deficiency in an enzyme complex of the mitochondrial respiratory chain which catalyzes the oxidation of cytochrome c utilizing molecular oxygen. The deficiency is characterized by heterogeneous phenotypes ranging from isolated myopathy to severe multisystem disease affecting several tissues and organs. Other Clinical Manifestations include hypertrophic cardiomyopathy, hepatomegaly and liver dysfunction, hypotonia, muscle weakness, exercise intolerance, developmental delay, delayed motor development and mental retardation. A homozygous mutation of c.154A-C in the COX20 gene has been found to result in reduced COX20, cytochrome c oxidase, and decreased activity. Other mutations have included a homozygous T52P.

Interactions
COX20 has co-complex interactions with proteins such as TMEM177, COX2, SCO1, COA6, and others in a COX2 and COX18 dependent manner.

References

Further reading 

Human proteins
Genes on human chromosome 1